Lauren Howe may refer to:
 Lauren Howe (golfer)
 Lauren Howe (model)